Balar may refer to:

 Balar, Aurangabad, a village in Aurangabad district, Bihar, India
 Balor, Balar or Bolar, leader of the Fomorians in Celtic mythology
 Balar is a most common Last name/Surname in Gujarat.